S. nitida may refer to:
 Segmentina nitida, the shining ram's-horn snail, a freshwater snail species found in Europe
 Soletellina nitida, the shining sunset shell, a bivalve mollusc species

See also 
 Nitida (disambiguation)